The 1970 United States House of Representatives elections was an election for the United States House of Representatives held on November 3, 1970, to elect members to serve in the 92nd United States Congress. They occurred in the middle of Richard M. Nixon's first term as president. His party, the Republican Party, lost a net of 12 seats to the Democratic Party, which thereby increased its majority in the House. Many viewed the results of the 1970 election as an indication of public fatigue over the ongoing Vietnam War as well as the fallout from the Kent State Massacre.

This was the first House election in which all 50 states used a single-member-district system to elect representatives instead of using at-large congressional districts.

Overall results

Summary of the November 3, 1970, election results

Special elections 

|-
! 
| Glenard P. Lipscomb
|  | Republican
| 1953 
|  | Incumbent died February 1, 1970.New member elected June 30, 1970.Republican hold.
| nowrap | 

|-
! 
| James B. Utt
|  | Republican
| 1952
|  | Incumbent died March 1, 1970.New member elected June 30, 1970.Republican hold.
| nowrap | 

|-
! 
| William St. Onge
|  | Democratic
| 1962
|  | Incumbent died May 1, 1970.New member elected November 3, 1970.Republican gain.
| nowrap | 

|-
! 
| Daniel J. Ronan
|  | Democratic
| 1964
|  | Incumbent died August 13, 1969.New member elected November 3, 1970.Democratic hold.
| nowrap | 

|-
! 
| William T. Cahill
|  | Republican
| 1958
|  | Incumbent resigned January 19, 1970, when elected governor of New Jersey.New member elected November 3, 1970.Republican hold.
| nowrap | 

|-
! 
| Michael J. Kirwan
|  | Democratic
| 1936
|  | Incumbent died July 27, 1970.New member elected November 3, 1970.Democratic hold.
| nowrap | 

|-
! 
| George Watkins
|  | Republican
| 1964
|  | Incumbent died August 7, 1970.New member elected November 3, 1970.Republican hold.
| nowrap | 

|}

Alabama 

|-
! 
| Jack Edwards
|  | Republican
| 1964
| Incumbent re-elected.
| nowrap | 

|-
! 
| William Louis Dickinson
|  | Republican
| 1964
| Incumbent re-elected.
| nowrap | 

|-
! 
| George W. Andrews
|  | Democratic
| 1944
| Incumbent re-elected.
| nowrap | 

|-
! 
| Bill Nichols
|  | Democratic
| 1966
| Incumbent re-elected.
| nowrap | 

|-
! 
| Walter Flowers
|  | Democratic
| 1968
| Incumbent re-elected.
| nowrap | 

|-
! 
| John Hall Buchanan Jr.
|  | Republican
| 1964
| Incumbent re-elected.
| nowrap | 

|-
! 
| Tom Bevill
|  | Democratic
| 1966
| Incumbent re-elected.
| nowrap | 

|-
! 
| Robert E. Jones Jr.
|  | Democratic
| 1947 
| Incumbent re-elected.
| nowrap | 

|}

Alaska 

|-
! 
| Howard Wallace Pollock
|  | Republican
| 1966
|  | Incumbent retired to run for Governor of Alaska.New member elected.Democratic gain.
| nowrap | 

|}

Arizona 

|-
! 
| John Jacob Rhodes
|  | Republican
| 1952
| Incumbent re-elected.
| nowrap | 

|-
! 
| Mo Udall
|  | Democratic
| 1961 
| Incumbent re-elected.
| nowrap | 

|-
! 
| Sam Steiger
|  | Republican
| 1966
| Incumbent re-elected.
| nowrap | 

|}

Arkansas 

|-
! 
| William Vollie Alexander Jr.
|  | Democratic
| 1968
| Incumbent re-elected.
| nowrap | 

|-
! 
| Wilbur Mills
|  | Democratic
| 1938
| Incumbent re-elected.
| nowrap | 

|-
! 
| John Paul Hammerschmidt
|  | Republican
| 1966
| Incumbent re-elected.
| nowrap | 

|-
! 
| David Pryor
|  | Democratic
| 1966
| Incumbent re-elected.
| nowrap | 

|}

California 

One Democratic seat was lost to Republicans.  Democrats, therefore, retained a 20-18 margin over Republicans.

|-
! 
| Donald H. Clausen
|  | Republican
| 1963 
| Incumbent re-elected.
| nowrap | 

|-
! 
| Harold T. Johnson
|  | Democratic
| 1958
| Incumbent re-elected.
| nowrap | 

|-
! 
| John E. Moss
|  | Democratic
| 1952
| Incumbent re-elected.
| nowrap | 

|-
! 
| Robert L. Leggett
|  | Democratic
| 1962
| Incumbent re-elected.
| nowrap | 

|-
! 
| Phillip Burton
|  | Democratic
| 1964
| Incumbent re-elected.
| nowrap | 

|-
! 
| William S. Mailliard
|  | Republican
| 1952
| Incumbent re-elected.
| nowrap | 

|-
! 
| Jeffery Cohelan
|  | Democratic
| 1958
|  | Incumbent lost renomination.New member elected.Democratic hold.
| nowrap | 

|-
! 
| George P. Miller
|  | Democratic
| 1944
| Incumbent re-elected.
| nowrap | 

|-
! 
| Don Edwards
|  | Democratic
| 1962
| Incumbent re-elected.
| nowrap | 

|-
! 
| Charles S. Gubser
|  | Republican
| 1952
| Incumbent re-elected.
| nowrap | 

|-
! 
| Pete McCloskey
|  | Republican
| 1967 
| Incumbent re-elected.
| nowrap | 

|-
! 
| Burt L. Talcott
|  | Republican
| 1962
| Incumbent re-elected.
| nowrap | 

|-
! 
| Charles M. Teague
|  | Republican
| 1954
| Incumbent re-elected.
| nowrap | 

|-
! 
| Jerome Waldie
|  | Democratic
| 1966
| Incumbent re-elected.
| nowrap | 

|-
! 
| John J. McFall
|  | Democratic
| 1956
| Incumbent re-elected.
| nowrap | 

|-
! 
| B. F. Sisk
|  | Democratic
| 1954
| Incumbent re-elected.
| nowrap | 

|-
! 
| Glenn M. Anderson
|  | Democratic
| 1968
| Incumbent re-elected.
| nowrap | 

|-
! 
| Bob Mathias
|  | Republican
| 1966
| Incumbent re-elected.
| nowrap | 

|-
! 
| Chet Holifield
|  | Democratic
| 1942
| Incumbent re-elected.
| nowrap | 

|-
! 
| H. Allen Smith
|  | Republican
| 1956
| Incumbent re-elected.
| nowrap | 

|-
! 
| Augustus Hawkins
|  | Democratic
| 1962
| Incumbent re-elected.
| nowrap | 

|-
! 
| James C. Corman
|  | Democratic
| 1960
| Incumbent re-elected.
| nowrap | 

|-
! 
| Del M. Clawson
|  | Republican
| 1963 
| Incumbent re-elected.
| nowrap | 

|-
! 
| John H. Rousselot
|  | Republican
| 19601962 1970 
| Incumbent re-elected.
| nowrap | 

|-
! 
| Charles E. Wiggins
|  | Republican
| 1966
| Incumbent re-elected.
| nowrap | 

|-
! 
| Thomas M. Rees
|  | Democratic
| 1965 
| Incumbent re-elected.
| nowrap | 

|-
! 
| Barry Goldwater Jr.
|  | Republican
| 1969 
| Incumbent re-elected.
| nowrap | 

|-
! 
| Alphonzo E. Bell Jr.
|  | Republican
| 1960
| Incumbent re-elected.
| nowrap | 

|-
! 
| George Brown Jr.
|  | Democratic
| 1962
|  | Incumbent retired to run for U.S. senator.New member elected.Democratic hold.
| nowrap | 

|-
! 
| Edward R. Roybal
|  | Democratic
| 1962
| Incumbent re-elected.
| nowrap | 

|-
! 
| Charles H. Wilson
|  | Democratic
| 1962
| Incumbent re-elected.
| nowrap | 

|-
! 
| Craig Hosmer
|  | Republican
| 1952
| Incumbent re-elected.
| nowrap | 

|-
! 
| Jerry Pettis
|  | Republican
| 1966
| Incumbent re-elected.
| nowrap | 

|-
! 
| Richard T. Hanna
|  | Democratic
| 1962
| Incumbent re-elected.
| nowrap | 

|-
! 
| John G. Schmitz
|  | Republican
| 1970
| Incumbent re-elected.
| nowrap | 

|-
! 
| Bob Wilson
|  | Republican
| 1952
| Incumbent re-elected.
| nowrap | 

|-
! 
| Lionel Van Deerlin
|  | Democratic
| 1962
| Incumbent re-elected.
| nowrap | 

|-
! 
| John V. Tunney
|  | Democratic
| 1964
|  | Incumbent retired to run for U.S. senator.New member elected.Republican gain.
| nowrap | 

|}

Colorado 

|-
! 
| Byron G. Rogers
|  | Democratic
| 1950
|  | Incumbent lost renomination.New member elected.Republican gain.
| nowrap | 

|-
! 
| Donald G. Brotzman
|  | Republican
| 19621964 1966
| Incumbent re-elected.
| nowrap | 

|-
! 
| Frank Evans
|  | Democratic
| 1964
| Incumbent re-elected.
| nowrap | 

|-
! 
| Wayne N. Aspinall
|  | Democratic
| 1948
| Incumbent re-elected.
| nowrap | 

|}

Connecticut 

|-
! 
| Emilio Q. Daddario
|  | Democratic
| 1958
|  | Incumbent retired to run for Governor of Connecticut.New member elected.Democratic hold.
| nowrap | 

|-
! 
| William St. Onge
|  | Democratic
| 1962
|  | Incumbent died.New member elected.Republican gain.
| nowrap | 

|-
! 
| Robert Giaimo
|  | Democratic
| 1958
| Incumbent re-elected.
| nowrap | 

|-
! 
| Lowell Weicker
|  | Republican
| 1968
|  | Incumbent retired to run for U.S. senator.New member elected.Republican hold.
| nowrap | 

|-
! 
| John S. Monagan
|  | Democratic
| 1958
| Incumbent re-elected.
| nowrap | 

|-
! 
| Thomas Meskill
|  | Republican
| 1966
|  | Incumbent retired to run for Governor of Connecticut.New member elected.Democratic gain.
| nowrap | 

|}

Delaware 

|-
! 
| William Roth
|  | Republican
| 1966
|  | Incumbent retired to run for U.S. senator.New member elected.Republican hold.
| nowrap | 

|}

Florida 

|-
! 
| Bob Sikes
|  | Democratic
| 19401944 1974
| Incumbent re-elected.
| nowrap | 

|-
! 
| Don Fuqua
|  | Democratic
| 1962
| Incumbent re-elected.
| nowrap | 

|-
! 
| Charles E. Bennett
|  | Democratic
| 1948
| Incumbent re-elected.
| nowrap | 

|-
! 
| Bill Chappell
|  | Democratic
| 1968
| Incumbent re-elected.
| nowrap | 

|-
! 
| Louis Frey Jr.
|  | Republican
| 1968
| Incumbent re-elected.
| nowrap | 

|-
! 
| Sam Gibbons
|  | Democratic
| 1962
| Incumbent re-elected.
| nowrap | 

|-
! 
| James A. Haley
|  | Democratic
| 1952
| Incumbent re-elected.
| nowrap | 

|-
! 
| William C. Cramer
|  | Republican
| 1954
|  | Incumbent retired to run for U.S. senator.New member elected.Republican hold.
| nowrap | 

|-
! 
| Paul Rogers
|  | Democratic
| 1954
| Incumbent re-elected.
| nowrap | 

|-
! 
| J. Herbert Burke
|  | Republican
| 1966
| Incumbent re-elected.
| nowrap | 

|-
! 
| Claude Pepper
|  | Democratic
| 1962
| Incumbent re-elected.
| nowrap | 

|-
! 
| Dante Fascell
|  | Democratic
| 1954
| Incumbent re-elected.
| nowrap | 

|}

Georgia 

|-
! 
| George Elliott Hagan
|  | Democratic
| 1960
| Incumbent re-elected.
| nowrap | 

|-
! 
| Maston E. O'Neal Jr.
|  | Democratic
| 1964
|  | Incumbent retired.New member elected.Democratic hold.
| nowrap | 

|-
! 
| Jack Brinkley
|  | Democratic
| 1966
| Incumbent re-elected.
| nowrap | 

|-
! 
| Benjamin B. Blackburn
|  | Republican
| 1966
| Incumbent re-elected.
| nowrap | 

|-
! 
| Fletcher Thompson
|  | Republican
| 1966
| Incumbent re-elected.
| nowrap | 

|-
! 
| John Flynt
|  | Democratic
| 1954
| Incumbent re-elected.
| nowrap | 

|-
! 
| John William Davis
|  | Democratic
| 1960
| Incumbent re-elected.
| nowrap | 

|-
! 
| W. S. Stuckey Jr.
|  | Democratic
| 1966
| Incumbent re-elected.
| nowrap | 

|-
! 
| Phillip M. Landrum
|  | Democratic
| 1952
| Incumbent re-elected.
| nowrap | 

|-
! 
| Robert Grier Stephens Jr.
|  | Democratic
| 1960
| Incumbent re-elected.
| nowrap | 

|}

Hawaii 

|-
! 
| Spark Matsunaga
|  | Democratic
| 1962
| Incumbent re-elected.
| nowrap | 

|-
! 
| Patsy Mink
|  | Democratic
| 1964
| Incumbent re-elected.
| nowrap | 

|}

Idaho 

|-
! 
| James A. McClure
|  | Republican
| 1966
| Incumbent re-elected.
| nowrap | 

|-
! 
| Orval H. Hansen
|  | Republican
| 1968
| Incumbent re-elected.
| nowrap | 

|}

Illinois 

|-
! 
| William L. Dawson
|  | Democratic
| 1942
|  | Incumbent retired.New member elected.Democratic hold.
| nowrap | 

|-
! 
| Abner Mikva
|  | Democratic
| 1968
| Incumbent re-elected.
| nowrap | 

|-
! 
| William T. Murphy
|  | Democratic
| 1958
|  | Incumbent retired.New member elected.Democratic hold.
| nowrap | 

|-
! 
| Ed Derwinski
|  | Republican
| 1958
| Incumbent re-elected.
| nowrap | 

|-
! 
| John C. Kluczynski
|  | Democratic
| 1950
| Incumbent re-elected.
| nowrap | 

|-
! 
| Daniel J. Ronan
|  | Democratic
| 1964
|  | Incumbent died.New member elected.Democratic hold.
| nowrap | 

|-
! 
| Frank Annunzio
|  | Democratic
| 1964
| Incumbent re-elected.
| nowrap | 

|-
! 
| Dan Rostenkowski
|  | Democratic
| 1958
| Incumbent re-elected.
| nowrap | 

|-
! 
| Sidney R. Yates
|  | Democratic
| 19481962 1964
| Incumbent re-elected.
| nowrap | 

|-
! 
| Harold R. Collier
|  | Republican
| 1956
| Incumbent re-elected.
| nowrap | 

|-
! 
| Roman Pucinski
|  | Democratic
| 1958
| Incumbent re-elected.
| nowrap | 

|-
! 
| Robert McClory
|  | Republican
| 1962
| Incumbent re-elected.
| nowrap | 

|-
! 
| Phil Crane
|  | Republican
| 1969 
| Incumbent re-elected.
| nowrap | 

|-
! 
| John N. Erlenborn
|  | Republican
| 1964
| Incumbent re-elected.
| nowrap | 

|-
! 
| Charlotte Thompson Reid
|  | Republican
| 1962
| Incumbent re-elected.
| nowrap | 

|-
! 
| John B. Anderson
|  | Republican
| 1960
| Incumbent re-elected.
| nowrap | 

|-
! 
| Leslie C. Arends
|  | Republican
| 1934
| Incumbent re-elected.
| nowrap | 

|-
! 
| Robert H. Michel
|  | Republican
| 1956
| Incumbent re-elected.
| nowrap | 

|-
! 
| Tom Railsback
|  | Republican
| 1966
| Incumbent re-elected.
| nowrap | 

|-
! 
| Paul Findley
|  | Republican
| 1960
| Incumbent re-elected.
| nowrap | 

|-
! 
| Kenneth J. Gray
|  | Democratic
| 1954
| Incumbent re-elected.
| nowrap | 

|-
! 
| William L. Springer
|  | Republican
| 1950
| Incumbent re-elected.
| nowrap | 

|-
! 
| George E. Shipley
|  | Democratic
| 1958
| Incumbent re-elected.
| nowrap | 

|-
! 
| Melvin Price
|  | Democratic
| 1944
| Incumbent re-elected.
| nowrap | 

|}

Indiana 

|-
! 
| Ray Madden
|  | Democratic
| 1942
| Incumbent re-elected.
| nowrap | 

|-
! 
| Earl Landgrebe
|  | Republican
| 1968
| Incumbent re-elected.
| nowrap | 

|-
! 
| John Brademas
|  | Democratic
| 1958
| Incumbent re-elected.
| nowrap | 

|-
! 
| E. Ross Adair
|  | Republican
| 1950
|  | Incumbent lost re-election.New member elected.Democratic gain.
| nowrap | 

|-
! 
| Richard L. Roudebush
|  | Republican
| 1960
|  | Incumbent retired to run for U.S. senator.New member elected.Republican hold.
| nowrap | 

|-
! 
| William G. Bray
|  | Republican
| 1950
| Incumbent re-elected.
| nowrap | 

|-
! 
| John T. Myers
|  | Republican
| 1966
| Incumbent re-elected.
| nowrap | 

|-
! 
| Roger H. Zion
|  | Republican
| 1966
| Incumbent re-elected.
| nowrap | 

|-
! 
| Lee H. Hamilton
|  | Democratic
| 1964
| Incumbent re-elected.
| nowrap | 

|-
! 
| David W. Dennis
|  | Republican
| 1968
| Incumbent re-elected.
| nowrap | 

|-
! 
| Andrew Jacobs Jr.
|  | Democratic
| 1964
| Incumbent re-elected.
| nowrap | 

|}

Iowa 

|-
! 
| Fred Schwengel
|  | Republican
| 19541964 1966
| Incumbent re-elected.
| nowrap | 

|-
! 
| John Culver
|  | Democratic
| 1964
| Incumbent re-elected.
| nowrap | 

|-
! 
| H. R. Gross
|  | Republican
| 1948
| Incumbent re-elected.
| nowrap | 

|-
! 
| John Henry Kyl
|  | Republican
| 1959 1964 1966
| Incumbent re-elected.
| nowrap | 

|-
! 
| Neal Edward Smith
|  | Democratic
| 1958
| Incumbent re-elected.
| nowrap | 

|-
! 
| Wiley Mayne
|  | Republican
| 1966
| Incumbent re-elected.
| nowrap | 

|-
! 
| William J. Scherle
|  | Republican
| 1966
| Incumbent re-elected.
| nowrap | 

|}

Kansas 

|-
! 
| Keith Sebelius
|  | Republican
| 1968
| Incumbent re-elected.
| nowrap | 

|-
! 
| Chester L. Mize
|  | Republican
| 1964
|  | Incumbent lost re-election.New member elected.Democratic gain.
| nowrap | 

|-
! 
| Larry Winn
|  | Republican
| 1966
| Incumbent re-elected.
| nowrap | 

|-
! 
| Garner E. Shriver
|  | Republican
| 1960
| Incumbent re-elected.
| nowrap | 

|-
! 
| Joe Skubitz
|  | Republican
| 1962
| Incumbent re-elected.
| nowrap | 

|}

Kentucky 

|-
! 
| Frank Stubblefield
|  | Democratic
| 1958
| Incumbent re-elected.
| nowrap | 

|-
! 
| William Natcher
|  | Democratic
| 1953 
| Incumbent re-elected.
| nowrap | 

|-
! 
| William Cowger
|  | Republican
| 1966
|  | Incumbent lost re-election.New member elected.Democratic gain.
| nowrap | 

|-
! 
| Gene Snyder
|  | Republican
| 19621964 1966
| Incumbent re-elected.
| nowrap | 

|-
! 
| Tim Lee Carter
|  | Republican
| 1964
| Incumbent re-elected.
| nowrap | 

|-
! 
| John C. Watts
|  | Democratic
| 1951 
| Incumbent re-elected.
| nowrap | 

|-
! 
| Carl D. Perkins
|  | Democratic
| 1948
| Incumbent re-elected.
| nowrap | 

|}

Louisiana 

|-
! 
| F. Edward Hébert
|  | Democratic
| 1940
| Incumbent re-elected.
| nowrap | 

|-
! 
| Hale Boggs
|  | Democratic
| 19401942 1946
| Incumbent re-elected.
| nowrap | 

|-
! 
| Patrick T. Caffery
|  | Democratic
| 1968
| Incumbent re-elected.
| nowrap | 

|-
! 
| Joe Waggonner
|  | Democratic
| 1961 
| Incumbent re-elected.
| nowrap | 

|-
! 
| Otto Passman
|  | Democratic
| 1946
| Incumbent re-elected.
| nowrap | 

|-
! 
| John Rarick
|  | Democratic
| 1966
| Incumbent re-elected.
| nowrap | 

|-
! 
| Edwin Edwards
|  | Democratic
| 1965 
| Incumbent re-elected.
| nowrap | 

|-
! 
| Speedy Long
|  | Democratic
| 1964
| Incumbent re-elected.
| nowrap | 

|}

Maine 

|-
! 
| Peter Kyros
|  | Democratic
| 1966
| Incumbent re-elected.
| nowrap | 

|-
! 
| William Hathaway
|  | Democratic
| 1964
| Incumbent re-elected.
| nowrap | 

|}

Maryland 

|-
! 
| Rogers Morton
|  | Republican
| 1962
| Incumbent re-elected.
| nowrap | 

|-
! 
| Clarence Long
|  | Democratic
| 1962
| Incumbent re-elected.
| nowrap | 

|-
! 
| Edward Garmatz
|  | Democratic
| 1947 
| Incumbent re-elected.
| nowrap | 

|-
! 
| George Hyde Fallon
|  | Democratic
| 1944
|  | Incumbent lost renomination.New member elected.Democratic hold.
| nowrap | 

|-
! 
| Lawrence Hogan
|  | Republican
| 1968
| Incumbent re-elected.
| nowrap | 

|-
! 
| J. Glenn Beall Jr.
|  | Republican
| 1968
|  | Incumbent retired to run for U.S. senator.New member elected.Democratic gain.
| nowrap | 

|-
! 
| Samuel Friedel
|  | Democratic
| 1952
|  | Incumbent lost renomination.New member elected.Democratic hold.
| nowrap | 

|-
! 
| Gilbert Gude
|  | Republican
| 1966
| Incumbent re-elected.
| nowrap | 

|}

Massachusetts 

|-
! 
| Silvio O. Conte
|  | Republican
| 1958
| Incumbent re-elected.
| nowrap | 

|-
! 
| Edward Boland
|  | Democratic
| 1952
| Incumbent re-elected.
| nowrap | 

|-
! 
| Philip J. Philbin
|  | Democratic
| 1942
|  | Incumbent lost renomination.New member elected.Defeated as IndependentDemocratic hold.
| nowrap | 

|-
! 
| Harold Donohue
|  | Democratic
| 1946
| Incumbent re-elected.
| nowrap | 

|-
! 
| F. Bradford Morse
|  | Republican
| 1960
| Incumbent re-elected.
| nowrap | 

|-
! 
| Michael J. Harrington
|  | Democratic
| 1969 
| Incumbent re-elected.
| nowrap | 

|-
! 
| Torbert Macdonald
|  | Democratic
| 1954
| Incumbent re-elected.
| nowrap | 

|-
! 
| Tip O'Neill
|  | Democratic
| 1952
| Incumbent re-elected.
| nowrap | 

|-
! 
| John W. McCormack
|  | Democratic
| 1928
|  | Incumbent retired.New member elected.Democratic hold.
| nowrap | 

|-
! 
| Margaret Heckler
|  | Republican
| 1966
| Incumbent re-elected.
| nowrap | 

|-
! 
| James A. Burke
|  | Democratic
| 1958
| Incumbent re-elected.
| nowrap | 

|-
! 
| Hastings Keith
|  | Republican
| 1958
| Incumbent re-elected.
| nowrap | 

|}

Michigan 

|-
! 
| John Conyers Jr.
|  | Democratic
| 1964
| Incumbent re-elected.
| nowrap | 

|-
! 
| Marvin L. Esch
|  | Republican
| 1966
| Incumbent re-elected.
| nowrap | 

|-
! 
| Garry E. Brown
|  | Republican
| 1966
| Incumbent re-elected.
| nowrap | 

|-
! 
| J. Edward Hutchinson
|  | Republican
| 1962
| Incumbent re-elected.
| nowrap | 

|-
! 
| Gerald Ford
|  | Republican
| 1948
| Incumbent re-elected.
| nowrap | 

|-
! 
| Charles E. Chamberlain
|  | Republican
| 1956
| Incumbent re-elected.
| nowrap | 

|-
! 
| Donald W. Riegle Jr.
|  | Republican
| 1966
| Incumbent re-elected.
| nowrap | 

|-
! 
| R. James Harvey
|  | Republican
| 1960
| Incumbent re-elected.
| nowrap | 

|-
! 
| Guy Vander Jagt
|  | Republican
| 1966
| Incumbent re-elected.
| nowrap | 

|-
! 
| Elford Albin Cederberg
|  | Republican
| 1952
| Incumbent re-elected.
| nowrap | 

|-
! 
| Philip Ruppe
|  | Republican
| 1966
| Incumbent re-elected.
| nowrap | 

|-
! 
| James G. O'Hara
|  | Democratic
| 1958
| Incumbent re-elected.
| nowrap | 

|-
! 
| Charles Diggs
|  | Democratic
| 1954
| Incumbent re-elected.
| nowrap | 

|-
! 
| Lucien Nedzi
|  | Democratic
| 1961 
| Incumbent re-elected.
| nowrap | 

|-
! 
| William D. Ford
|  | Democratic
| 1964
| Incumbent re-elected.
| nowrap | 

|-
! 
| John D. Dingell Jr.
|  | Democratic
| 1955 
| Incumbent re-elected.
| nowrap | 

|-
! 
| Martha W. Griffiths
|  | Democratic
| 1954
| Incumbent re-elected.
| nowrap | 

|-
! 
| William Broomfield
|  | Republican
| 1956
| Incumbent re-elected.
| nowrap | 

|-
! 
| Jack H. McDonald
|  | Republican
| 1966
| Incumbent re-elected.
| nowrap | 

|}

Minnesota 

|-
! 
| Al Quie
|  | Republican
| 1958
| Incumbent re-elected.
| nowrap | 

|-
! 
| Ancher Nelsen
|  | Republican
| 1958
| Incumbent re-elected.
| nowrap | 

|-
! 
| Clark MacGregor
|  | Republican
| 1960
|  | Incumbent retired to run for U.S. senator.New member elected.Republican hold.
| nowrap | 

|-
! 
| Joseph Karth
|  | 
| 1958
| Incumbent re-elected.
| nowrap | 

|-
! 
| Donald M. Fraser
|  | 
| 1962
| Incumbent re-elected.
| nowrap | 

|-
! 
| John M. Zwach
|  | Republican
| 1966
| Incumbent re-elected.
| nowrap | 

|-
! 
| Odin Langen
|  | Republican
| 1958
|  | Incumbent lost re-election.New member elected. gain.
| nowrap | 

|-
! 
| John Blatnik
|  | 
| 1946
| Incumbent re-elected.
| nowrap | 

|}

Mississippi 

|-
! 
| Thomas Abernethy
|  | Democratic
| 1942
| Incumbent re-elected.
| nowrap | 

|-
! 
| Jamie Whitten
|  | Democratic
| 1941 
| Incumbent re-elected.
| nowrap | 

|-
! 
| Charles H. Griffin
|  | Democratic
| 1968
| Incumbent re-elected.
| nowrap | 

|-
! 
| Sonny Montgomery
|  | Democratic
| 1966
| Incumbent re-elected.
| nowrap | 

|-
! 
| William M. Colmer
|  | Democratic
| 1932
| Incumbent re-elected.
| nowrap | 

|}

Missouri 

|-
! 
| Bill Clay
|  | Democratic
| 1968
| Incumbent re-elected.
| nowrap | 

|-
! 
| James W. Symington
|  | Democratic
| 1968
| Incumbent re-elected.
| nowrap | 

|-
! 
| Leonor Sullivan
|  | Democratic
| 1952
| Incumbent re-elected.
| nowrap | 

|-
! 
| William J. Randall
|  | Democratic
| 1959 
| Incumbent re-elected.
| nowrap | 

|-
! 
| Richard Walker Bolling
|  | Democratic
| 1948
| Incumbent re-elected.
| nowrap | 

|-
! 
| William Raleigh Hull Jr.
|  | Democratic
| 1954
| Incumbent re-elected.
| nowrap | 

|-
! 
| Durward Gorham Hall
|  | Republican
| 1960
| Incumbent re-elected.
| nowrap | 

|-
! 
| Richard Howard Ichord Jr.
|  | Democratic
| 1960
| Incumbent re-elected.
| nowrap | 

|-
! 
| William L. Hungate
|  | Democratic
| 1964
| Incumbent re-elected.
| nowrap | 

|-
! 
| Bill Burlison
|  | Democratic
| 1968
| Incumbent re-elected.
| nowrap | 

|}

Montana 

|-
! 
| Arnold Olsen
|  | Democratic
| 1960
|  | Incumbent lost re-election.New member elected.Republican gain.
| nowrap | 

|-
! 
| John Melcher
|  | Democratic
| 1969 
| Incumbent re-elected.
| nowrap | 

|}

Nebraska 

|-
! 
| Robert Vernon Denney
|  | Republican
| 1966
|  | Incumbent retired.New member elected.Republican hold.
| nowrap | 

|-
! 
| Glenn Cunningham
|  | Republican
| 1956
|  | Incumbent lost renomination.New member elected.Republican hold.
| nowrap | 

|-
! 
| David Martin
|  | Republican
| 1960
| Incumbent re-elected.
| nowrap | 

|}

Nevada 

|-
! 
| Walter S. Baring Jr.
|  | Democratic
| 19481952 1956
| Incumbent re-elected.
| nowrap | 

|}

New Hampshire 

|-
! 
| Louis C. Wyman
|  | Republican
| 19621964 1966
| Incumbent re-elected.
| nowrap | 

|-
! 
| James Colgate Cleveland
|  | Republican
| 1962
| Incumbent re-elected.
| nowrap | 

|}

New Jersey 

|-
! 
| John E. Hunt
|  | Republican
| 1966
| Incumbent re-elected.
| nowrap | 

|-
! 
| Charles W. Sandman Jr.
|  | Republican
| 1966
| Incumbent re-elected.
| nowrap | 

|-
! 
| James J. Howard
|  | Democratic
| 1964
| Incumbent re-elected.
| nowrap | 

|-
! 
| Frank Thompson
|  | Democratic
| 1954
| Incumbent re-elected.
| nowrap | 

|-
! 
| Peter Frelinghuysen Jr.
|  | Republican
| 1952
| Incumbent re-elected.
| nowrap | 

|-
! 
| William T. Cahill
|  | Republican
| 1958
|  | Resigned when elected Governor of New Jersey.New member elected.Republican hold.
| nowrap | 

|-
! 
| William B. Widnall
|  | Republican
| 1950
| Incumbent re-elected.
| nowrap | 

|-
! 
| Charles Samuel Joelson
|  | Democratic
| 1960
|  | Resigned when appointed judgeDemocratic hold.
| nowrap | 

|-
! 
| Henry Helstoski
|  | Democratic
| 1964
| Incumbent re-elected.
| nowrap | 

|-
! 
| Peter W. Rodino
|  | Democratic
| 1948
| Incumbent re-elected.
| nowrap | 

|-
! 
| Joseph Minish
|  | Democratic
| 1962
| Incumbent re-elected.
| nowrap | 

|-
! 
| Florence P. Dwyer
|  | Republican
| 1956
| Incumbent re-elected.
| nowrap | 

|-
! 
| Cornelius Gallagher
|  | Democratic
| 1958
| Incumbent re-elected.
| nowrap | 

|-
! 
| Dominick V. Daniels
|  | Democratic
| 1958
| Incumbent re-elected.
| nowrap | 

|-
! 
| Edward J. Patten
|  | Democratic
| 1962
| Incumbent re-elected.
| nowrap | 

|}

New Mexico 

|-
! 
| Manuel Lujan Jr.
|  | Republican
| 1968
| Incumbent re-elected.
| nowrap | 

|-
! 
| Ed Foreman
|  | Republican
| 19621964 1968
|  | Incumbent lost re-election.New member elected.Democratic gain.
| nowrap | 

|}

New York 

|-
! 
| Otis G. Pike
|  | Democratic
| 1960
| Incumbent re-elected.
| nowrap | 

|-
! 
| James R. Grover Jr.
|  | Republican
| 1962
| Incumbent re-elected.
| nowrap | 

|-
! 
| Lester L. Wolff
|  | Democratic
| 1964
| Incumbent re-elected.
| nowrap | 

|-
! 
| John W. Wydler
|  | Republican
| 1962
| Incumbent re-elected.
| nowrap | 

|-
! 
| Allard K. Lowenstein
|  | Democratic
| 1968
|  | Incumbent lost re-election.New member elected.Republican gain.
| nowrap | 

|-
! 
| Seymour Halpern
|  | Republican
| 1958
| Incumbent re-elected.
| nowrap | 

|-
! 
| Joseph P. Addabbo
|  | Democratic
| 1960
| Incumbent re-elected.
| nowrap | 

|-
! 
| Benjamin Stanley Rosenthal
|  | Democratic
| 1962
| Incumbent re-elected.
| nowrap | 

|-
! 
| James J. Delaney
|  | Democratic
| 19441946 1948
| Incumbent re-elected.
| nowrap | 

|-
! 
| Emanuel Celler
|  | Democratic
| 1922
| Incumbent re-elected.
| nowrap | 

|-
! 
| Frank J. Brasco
|  | Democratic
| 1966
| Incumbent re-elected.
| nowrap | 

|-
! 
| Shirley Chisholm
|  | Democratic
| 1968
| Incumbent re-elected.
| nowrap | 

|-
! 
| Bertram L. Podell
|  | Democratic
| 1968
| Incumbent re-elected.
| nowrap | 

|-
! 
| John J. Rooney
|  | Democratic
| 1944
| Incumbent re-elected.
| nowrap | 

|-
! 
| Hugh Carey
|  | Democratic
| 1960
| Incumbent re-elected.
| nowrap | 

|-
! 
| John M. Murphy
|  | Democratic
| 1962
| Incumbent re-elected.
| nowrap | 

|-
! 
| Ed Koch
|  | Democratic
| 1968
| Incumbent re-elected.
| nowrap | 

|-
! 
| Adam Clayton Powell Jr.
|  | Democratic
| 1944
|  | Incumbent lost renomination.New member elected.Democratic hold.
| nowrap | 

|-
! 
| Leonard Farbstein
|  | Democratic
| 1956
|  | Incumbent lost renomination.New member elected.Democratic hold.
| nowrap | 

|-
! 
| William Fitts Ryan
|  | Democratic
| 1960
| Incumbent re-elected.
| nowrap | 

|-
! 
| colspan=3  | None (District created)
|  | New seatDemocratic gain.
| nowrap | 

|-
! rowspan=2  | 
| Jacob H. Gilbert
|  | Democratic
| 1960
|  | Lost renomination in a redistricting contest.Democratic loss.
| rowspan=2 nowrap | 

|-
| James H. Scheuer
|  | Democratic
| 1964
| Incumbent re-elected.

|-
! 
| Jonathan Brewster Bingham
|  | Democratic
| 1964
| Incumbent re-elected.
| nowrap | 

|-
! 
| Mario Biaggi
|  | Democratic
| 1968
| Incumbent re-elected.
| nowrap | 

|-
! 
| Richard Ottinger
|  | Democratic
| 1964
|  | Incumbent retired to run for U.S. senator.New member elected.Republican gain.
| nowrap | 

|-
! 
| Ogden R. Reid
|  | Republican
| 1962
| Incumbent re-elected.
| nowrap | 

|-
! 
| Martin B. McKneally
|  | Republican
| 1968
|  | Incumbent lost re-election.New member elected.Democratic gain.
| nowrap | 

|-
! 
| Hamilton Fish IV
|  | Republican
| 1968
| Incumbent re-elected.
| nowrap | 

|-
! rowspan=2  | 
| Daniel E. Button
|  | Republican
| 1966
|  | Lost re-election in a redistricting contest.Republican loss.
| rowspan=2 nowrap | 

|-
| Samuel S. Stratton
|  | Democratic
| 1958
| Incumbent re-elected.

|-
! 
| Carleton J. King
|  | Republican
| 1960
| Incumbent re-elected.
| nowrap | 

|-
! 
| Robert C. McEwen
|  | Republican
| 1964
| Incumbent re-elected.
| nowrap | 

|-
! 
| Alexander Pirnie
|  | Republican
| 1958
| Incumbent re-elected.
| nowrap | 

|-
! 
| Howard W. Robison
|  | Republican
| 1958
| Incumbent re-elected.
| nowrap | 

|-
! 
| colspan=3  | None (District created)
|  | New seatRepublican gain.
| nowrap | 

|-
! 
| James M. Hanley
|  | Democratic
| 1964
| Incumbent re-elected.
| nowrap | 

|-
! 
| Frank Horton
|  | Republican
| 1962
| Incumbent re-elected.
| nowrap | 

|-
! 
| Barber Conable
|  | Republican
| 1964
| Incumbent re-elected.
| nowrap | 

|-
! 
| James F. Hastings
|  | Republican
| 1968
| Incumbent re-elected.
| nowrap | 

|-
! 
| Richard D. McCarthy
|  | Democratic
| 1964
|  | Incumbent retired to run for U.S. senator.New member elected.Republican gain.
| nowrap | 

|-
! 
| Henry P. Smith III
|  | Republican
| 1964
| Incumbent re-elected.
| nowrap | 

|-
! 
| Thaddeus J. Dulski
|  | Democratic
| 1958
| Incumbent re-elected.
| nowrap | 

|}

North Carolina 

|-
! 
| Walter B. Jones Sr.
|  | Democratic
| 1966
| Incumbent re-elected.
| nowrap | 

|-
! 
| Lawrence H. Fountain
|  | Democratic
| 1952
| Incumbent re-elected.
| nowrap | 

|-
! 
| David N. Henderson
|  | Democratic
| 1960
| Incumbent re-elected.
| nowrap | 

|-
! 
| Nick Galifianakis
|  | Democratic
| 1966
| Incumbent re-elected.
| nowrap | 

|-
! 
| Wilmer Mizell
|  | Republican
| 1968
| Incumbent re-elected.
| nowrap | 

|-
! 
| L. Richardson Preyer
|  | Democratic
| 1968
| Incumbent re-elected.
| nowrap | 

|-
! 
| Alton Lennon
|  | Democratic
| 1956
| Incumbent re-elected.
| nowrap | 

|-
! 
| Earl B. Ruth
|  | Republican
| 1968
| Incumbent re-elected.
| nowrap | 

|-
! 
| Charles R. Jonas
|  | Republican
| 1952
| Incumbent re-elected.
| nowrap | 

|-
! 
| Jim Broyhill
|  | Republican
| 1962
| Incumbent re-elected.
| nowrap | 

|-
! 
| Roy A. Taylor
|  | Democratic
| 1960
| Incumbent re-elected.
| nowrap | 

|}

North Dakota 

|-
! 
| Mark Andrews
|  | Republican
| 1963 
| Incumbent re-elected.
| nowrap | 

|-
! 
| Thomas S. Kleppe
|  | Republican
| 1966
|  | Incumbent retired to run for U.S. senator.New member elected.Democratic gain.
| nowrap | 

|}

Ohio 

|-
! 
| Robert Taft Jr.
|  | Republican
| 19621964 1966
|  | Incumbent retired to run for U.S. senator.New member elected.Republican hold.
| nowrap | 

|-
! 
| Donald D. Clancy
|  | Republican
| 1960
| Incumbent re-elected.
| nowrap | 

|-
! 
| Charles W. Whalen Jr.
|  | Republican
| 1966
| Incumbent re-elected.
| nowrap | 

|-
! 
| William Moore McCulloch
|  | Republican
| 1947 
| Incumbent re-elected.
| nowrap | 

|-
! 
| Del Latta
|  | Republican
| 1958
| Incumbent re-elected.
| nowrap | 

|-
! 
| Bill Harsha
|  | Republican
| 1960
| Incumbent re-elected.
| nowrap | 

|-
! 
| Bud Brown
|  | Republican
| 1965 
| Incumbent re-elected.
| nowrap | 

|-
! 
| Jackson Edward Betts
|  | Republican
| 1950
| Incumbent re-elected.
| nowrap | 

|-
! 
| Thomas L. Ashley
|  | Democratic
| 1954
| Incumbent re-elected.
| nowrap | 

|-
! 
| Clarence E. Miller
|  | Republican
| 1966
| Incumbent re-elected.
| nowrap | 

|-
! 
| J. William Stanton
|  | Republican
| 1964
| Incumbent re-elected.
| nowrap | 

|-
! 
| Samuel L. Devine
|  | Republican
| 1958
| Incumbent re-elected.
| nowrap | 

|-
! 
| Charles Adams Mosher
|  | Republican
| 1960
| Incumbent re-elected.
| nowrap | 

|-
! 
| William Hanes Ayres
|  | Republican
| 1950
|  | Incumbent lost re-election.New member elected.Democratic gain.
| nowrap | 

|-
! 
| Chalmers Wylie
|  | Republican
| 1966
| Incumbent re-elected.
| nowrap | 

|-
! 
| Frank T. Bow
|  | Republican
| 1950
| Incumbent re-elected.
| nowrap | 

|-
! 
| John M. Ashbrook
|  | Republican
| 1960
| Incumbent re-elected.
| nowrap | 

|-
! 
| Wayne Hays
|  | Democratic
| 1948
| Incumbent re-elected.
| nowrap | 

|-
! 
| Michael J. Kirwan
|  | Democratic
| 1936
|  | Incumbent died.New member elected.Democratic hold.
| nowrap | 

|-
! 
| Michael A. Feighan
|  | Democratic
| 1942
|  | Incumbent lost renomination.New member elected.Democratic hold.
| nowrap | 

|-
! 
| Louis Stokes
|  | Democratic
| 1968
| Incumbent re-elected.
| nowrap | 

|-
! 
| Charles Vanik
|  | Democratic
| 1954
| Incumbent re-elected.
| nowrap | 

|-
! 
| William Edwin Minshall Jr.
|  | Republican
| 1954
| Incumbent re-elected.
| nowrap | 

|-
! 
| Donald "Buz" Lukens
|  | Republican
| 1966
|  | Incumbent retired to run for Governor of Ohio.New member elected.Republican hold.
| nowrap | 

|}

Oklahoma 

|-
! 
| Page Belcher
|  | Republican
| 1950
| Incumbent re-elected.
| nowrap | 

|-
! 
| Ed Edmondson
|  | Democratic
| 1952
| Incumbent re-elected.
| nowrap | 

|-
! 
| Carl Albert
|  | Democratic
| 1946
| Incumbent re-elected.
| nowrap | 

|-
! 
| Tom Steed
|  | Democratic
| 1948
| Incumbent re-elected.
| nowrap | 

|-
! 
| John Jarman
|  | Democratic
| 1950
| Incumbent re-elected.
| nowrap | 

|-
! 
| John Newbold Camp
|  | Republican
| 1968
| Incumbent re-elected.
| nowrap | 

|}

Oregon 

|-
! 
| Wendell Wyatt
|  | Republican
| 1964
| Incumbent re-elected.
| nowrap | 

|-
! 
| Al Ullman
|  | Democratic
| 1956
| Incumbent re-elected.
| nowrap | 

|-
! 
| Edith Green
|  | Democratic
| 1954
| Incumbent re-elected.
| nowrap | 

|-
! 
| John R. Dellenback
|  | Republican
| 1966
| Incumbent re-elected.
| nowrap | 

|}

Pennsylvania 

|-
! 
| William A. Barrett
|  | Democratic
| 19441946 1948
| Incumbent re-elected.
| nowrap | 

|-
! 
| Robert N. C. Nix Sr.
|  | Democratic
| 1958
| Incumbent re-elected.
| nowrap | 

|-
! 
| James A. Byrne
|  | Democratic
| 1952
| Incumbent re-elected.
| nowrap | 

|-
! 
| Joshua Eilberg
|  | Democratic
| 1966
| Incumbent re-elected.
| nowrap | 

|-
! 
| William J. Green III
|  | Democratic
| 1964
| Incumbent re-elected.
| nowrap | 

|-
! 
| Gus Yatron
|  | Democratic
| 1968
| Incumbent re-elected.
| nowrap | 

|-
! 
| Lawrence G. Williams
|  | Republican
| 1966
| Incumbent re-elected.
| nowrap | 

|-
! 
| Edward G. Biester Jr.
|  | Republican
| 1966
| Incumbent re-elected.
| nowrap | 

|-
! 
| George Watkins
|  | Republican
| 1964
|  | Incumbent died.New member elected.Republican hold.
| nowrap | 

|-
! 
| Joseph M. McDade
|  | Republican
| 1962
| Incumbent re-elected.
| nowrap | 

|-
! 
| Dan Flood
|  | Democratic
| 19441946 19481952 1954
| Incumbent re-elected.
| nowrap | 

|-
! 
| J. Irving Whalley
|  | Republican
| 1960
| Incumbent re-elected.
| nowrap | 

|-
! 
| Lawrence Coughlin
|  | Republican
| 1968
| Incumbent re-elected.
| nowrap | 

|-
! 
| William S. Moorhead
|  | Democratic
| 1958
| Incumbent re-elected.
| nowrap | 

|-
! 
| Fred B. Rooney
|  | Democratic
| 1963 
| Incumbent re-elected.
| nowrap | 

|-
! 
| Edwin Duing Eshleman
|  | Republican
| 1966
| Incumbent re-elected.
| nowrap | 

|-
! 
| Herman T. Schneebeli
|  | Republican
| 1960
| Incumbent re-elected.
| nowrap | 

|-
! 
| Robert J. Corbett
|  | Republican
| 19381940 1944
| Incumbent re-elected.
| nowrap | 

|-
! 
| George Atlee Goodling
|  | Republican
| 19601964 1966
| Incumbent re-elected.
| nowrap | 

|-
! 
| Joseph M. Gaydos
|  | Democratic
| 1968
| Incumbent re-elected.
| nowrap | 

|-
! 
| John Herman Dent
|  | Democratic
| 1958
| Incumbent re-elected.
| nowrap | 

|-
! 
| John P. Saylor
|  | Republican
| 1949 
| Incumbent re-elected.
| nowrap | 

|-
! 
| Albert W. Johnson
|  | Republican
| 1963 
| Incumbent re-elected.
| nowrap | 

|-
! 
| Joseph P. Vigorito
|  | Democratic
| 1964
| Incumbent re-elected.
| nowrap | 

|-
! 
| Frank M. Clark
|  | Democratic
| 1954
| Incumbent re-elected.
| nowrap | 

|-
! 
| Thomas E. Morgan
|  | Democratic
| 1944
| Incumbent re-elected.
| nowrap | 

|-
! 
| James G. Fulton
|  | Republican
| 1944
| Incumbent re-elected.
| nowrap | 

|}

Rhode Island 

|-
! 
| Fernand St. Germain
|  | Democratic
| 1960
| Incumbent re-elected.
| nowrap | 

|-
! 
| Robert Tiernan
|  | Democratic
| 1967 
| Incumbent re-elected.
| nowrap | 

|}

South Carolina 

|-
! 
| L. Mendel Rivers
|  | Democratic
| 1940
| Incumbent re-elected.
| nowrap | 

|-
! 
| Albert Watson
|  | Republican
| 1962
|  | Incumbent retired to run for Governor of South Carolina.New member elected.Republican hold.
| nowrap | 

|-
! 
| William Jennings Bryan Dorn
|  | Democratic
| 19461948 1950
| Incumbent re-elected.
| nowrap | 

|-
! 
| James Mann
|  | Democratic
| 1968
| Incumbent re-elected.
| nowrap | 

|-
! 
| Thomas S. Gettys
|  | Democratic
| 1964
| Incumbent re-elected.
| nowrap | 

|-
! 
| John L. McMillan
|  | Democratic
| 1938
| Incumbent re-elected.
| nowrap | 

|}

South Dakota 

|-
! 
| Ben Reifel
|  | Republican
| 1960
|  | Incumbent retired.New member elected.Democratic gain.
| nowrap | 

|-
! 
| Ellis Yarnal Berry
|  | Republican
| 1950
|  | Incumbent retired.New member elected.Democratic gain.
| nowrap | 

|}

Tennessee 

|-
! 
| Jimmy Quillen
|  | Republican
| 1962
| Incumbent re-elected.
| nowrap | 

|-
! 
| John Duncan Sr.
|  | Republican
| 1964
| Incumbent re-elected.
| nowrap | 

|-
! 
| Bill Brock
|  | Republican
| 1962
|  | Incumbent retired to run for U.S. senator.New member elected.Republican hold.
| nowrap | 

|-
! 
| Joe L. Evins
|  | Democratic
| 1946
| Incumbent re-elected.
| nowrap | 

|-
! 
| Richard Fulton
|  | Democratic
| 1962
| Incumbent re-elected.
| nowrap | 

|-
! 
| William Anderson
|  | Democratic
| 1964
| Incumbent re-elected.
| nowrap | 

|-
! 
| Ray Blanton
|  | Democratic
| 1966
| Incumbent re-elected.
| nowrap | 

|-
! 
| Ed Jones
|  | Democratic
| 1969 
| Incumbent re-elected.
| nowrap | 

|-
! 
| Dan Kuykendall
|  | Republican
| 1966
| Incumbent re-elected.
| nowrap | 

|}

Texas 

|-
! 
| Wright Patman
|  | Democratic
| 1928
| Incumbent re-elected.
| nowrap | 

|-
! 
| John Dowdy
|  | Democratic
| 1952
| Incumbent re-elected.
| nowrap | 

|-
! 
| James M. Collins
|  | Republican
| 1968
| Incumbent re-elected.
| nowrap | 

|-
! 
| Ray Roberts
|  | Democratic
| 1962
| Incumbent re-elected.
| nowrap | 

|-
! 
| Earle Cabell
|  | Democratic
| 1964
| Incumbent re-elected.
| nowrap | 

|-
! 
| Olin E. Teague
|  | Democratic
| 1946
| Incumbent re-elected.
| nowrap | 

|-
! 
| George H. W. Bush
|  | Republican
| 1966
|  | Incumbent retired to run for U.S. senator.New member elected.Republican hold.
| nowrap | 

|-
! 
| Robert C. Eckhardt
|  | Democratic
| 1966
| Incumbent re-elected.
| nowrap | 

|-
! 
| Jack Brooks
|  | Democratic
| 1952
| Incumbent re-elected.
| nowrap | 

|-
! 
| J. J. Pickle
|  | Democratic
| 1963 
| Incumbent re-elected.
| nowrap | 

|-
! 
| William R. Poage
|  | Democratic
| 1936
| Incumbent re-elected.
| nowrap | 

|-
! 
| Jim Wright
|  | Democratic
| 1954
| Incumbent re-elected.
| nowrap | 

|-
! 
| Graham B. Purcell Jr.
|  | Democratic
| 1962
| Incumbent re-elected.
| nowrap | 

|-
! 
| John Andrew Young
|  | Democratic
| 1956
| Incumbent re-elected.
| nowrap | 

|-
! 
| Kika de la Garza
|  | Democratic
| 1964
| Incumbent re-elected.
| nowrap | 

|-
! 
| Richard Crawford White
|  | Democratic
| 1964
| Incumbent re-elected.
| nowrap | 

|-
! 
| Omar Burleson
|  | Democratic
| 1946
| Incumbent re-elected.
| nowrap | 

|-
! 
| Robert Price
|  | Republican
| 1966
| Incumbent re-elected.
| nowrap | 

|-
! 
| George H. Mahon
|  | Democratic
| 1934
| Incumbent re-elected.
| nowrap | 

|-
! 
| Henry B. González
|  | Democratic
| 1961 
| Incumbent re-elected.
| nowrap | 

|-
! 
| O. C. Fisher
|  | Democratic
| 1942
| Incumbent re-elected.
| nowrap | 

|-
! 
| Robert R. Casey
|  | Democratic
| 1958
| Incumbent re-elected.
| nowrap | 

|-
! 
| Abraham Kazen
|  | Democratic
| 1966
| Incumbent re-elected.
| nowrap | 

|}

Utah 

|-
! 
| Laurence J. Burton
|  | Republican
| 1962
|  | Incumbent retired to run for U.S. senator.New member elected.Democratic gain.
| nowrap | 

|-
! 
| Sherman P. Lloyd
|  | Republican
| 19621964 1966
| Incumbent re-elected.
| nowrap | 

|}

Vermont 

|-
! 
| Robert Stafford
|  | Republican
| 1960
| Incumbent re-elected.
| nowrap | 

|}

Virginia 

|-
! 
| Thomas N. Downing
|  | Democratic
| 1958
| Incumbent re-elected.
| nowrap | 

|-
! 
| G. William Whitehurst
|  | Republican
| 1968
| Incumbent re-elected.
| nowrap | 

|-
! 
| David E. Satterfield III
|  | Democratic
| 1964
| Incumbent re-elected.
| nowrap | 

|-
! 
| Watkins Moorman Abbitt
|  | Democratic
| 1948
| Incumbent re-elected.
| nowrap | 

|-
! 
| Dan Daniel
|  | Democratic
| 1968
| Incumbent re-elected.
| nowrap | 

|-
! 
| Richard Harding Poff
|  | Republican
| 1952
| Incumbent re-elected.
| nowrap | 

|-
! 
| John Otho Marsh Jr.
|  | Democratic
| 1962
|  | Incumbent retired.New member elected.Republican gain.
| nowrap | 

|-
! 
| William L. Scott
|  | Republican
| 1966
| Incumbent re-elected.
| nowrap | 

|-
! 
| William C. Wampler
|  | Republican
| 19521954 1966
| Incumbent re-elected.
| nowrap | 

|-
! 
| Joel Broyhill
|  | Republican
| 1952
| Incumbent re-elected.
| nowrap | 

|}

Washington 

|-
! 
| Thomas Pelly
|  | Republican
| 1952
| Incumbent re-elected.
| nowrap | 

|-
! 
| Lloyd Meeds
|  | Democratic
| 1964
| Incumbent re-elected.
| nowrap | 

|-
! 
| Julia Butler Hansen
|  | Democratic
| 1960
| Incumbent re-elected.
| nowrap | 

|-
! 
| Catherine Dean May
|  | Republican
| 1958
|  | Incumbent lost re-election.New member elected.Democratic gain.
| nowrap | 

|-
! 
| Tom Foley
|  | Democratic
| 1964
| Incumbent re-elected.
| nowrap | 

|-
! 
| Floyd Hicks
|  | Democratic
| 1964
| Incumbent re-elected.
| nowrap | 

|-
! 
| Brock Adams
|  | Democratic
| 1964
| Incumbent re-elected.
| nowrap | 

|}

West Virginia 

|-
! 
| Bob Mollohan
|  | Democratic
| 19521956 1968
| Incumbent re-elected.
| nowrap | 

|-
! 
| Harley Orrin Staggers
|  | Democratic
| 1948
| Incumbent re-elected.
| nowrap | 

|-
! 
| John M. Slack Jr.
|  | Democratic
| 1958
| Incumbent re-elected.
| nowrap | 

|-
! 
| Ken Hechler
|  | Democratic
| 1958
| Incumbent re-elected.
| nowrap | 

|-
! 
| James Kee
|  | Democratic
| 1964
| Incumbent re-elected.
| nowrap | 

|}

Wisconsin 

|-
! 
| Henry C. Schadeberg
|  | Republican
| 19601964 1966
|  | Incumbent lost re-election.New member elected.Democratic gain.
| nowrap | 

|-
! 
| Robert Kastenmeier
|  | Democratic
| 1958
| Incumbent re-elected.
| nowrap | 

|-
! 
| Vernon Wallace Thomson
|  | Republican
| 1960
| Incumbent re-elected.
| nowrap | 

|-
! 
| Clement J. Zablocki
|  | Democratic
| 1948
| Incumbent re-elected.
| nowrap | 

|-
! 
| Henry S. Reuss
|  | Democratic
| 1954
| Incumbent re-elected.
| nowrap | 

|-
! 
| William A. Steiger
|  | Republican
| 1966
| Incumbent re-elected.
| nowrap | 

|-
! 
| Dave Obey
|  | Democratic
| 1969 
| Incumbent re-elected.
| nowrap | 

|-
! 
| John W. Byrnes
|  | Republican
| 1944
| Incumbent re-elected.
| nowrap | 

|-
! 
| Glenn Robert Davis
|  | Republican
| 1947 1956 1964
| Incumbent re-elected.
| nowrap | 

|-
! 
| Alvin O'Konski
|  | Republican
| 1942
| Incumbent re-elected.
| nowrap | 

|}

Wyoming 

|-
! 
| John S. Wold
|  | Republican
| 1968
|  | Incumbent retired to run for U.S. senator.New member elected.Democratic gain.
| nowrap | 

|}

See also
 1970 United States elections
 1970 United States gubernatorial elections
 1970 United States Senate elections
 91st United States Congress
 92nd United States Congress

References

External links
 Statistics of the Congressional Election of November 3, 1970, official site of the Clerk of the U.S. House of Representatives